Lea Manor High School Performing Arts College is a secondary school in Luton, Bedfordshire which opened in 1974. The school was awarded with Performing Arts specialism in 2007.

Performing Arts Specialism 

Lea Manor High School is a specialised Performing Arts college, dedicated to showing off the talent in each of its students. Each year, the school performs numerous musicals or plays which include Hairspray, We Will Rock You, Anything Goes, Oliver!, Grease, Annie, The Wizard of Oz, Billy Elliot and was the first school in Bedfordshire to successfully perform The Diary of Anne Frank. The specialism has funded many school trips to West End Theatres to see shows such as The Lion King, Chicago, The Woman in Black and Wicked.

Building Schools for the Future Programme 

Currently, Lea Manor High School is undergoing building and refurbishing work under the government's Building Schools for the Future Programme (BSF) and is one of the first schools in Luton to be transformed. The building firm Wates Group won the contract to rebuild or remodel every secondary school in Luton. The school will be more student-friendly and modern, including a brand new community library and community theatre which will become the biggest in Luton.

Phase one of the remodelling has been completed and was opened to students in Autumn 2009. This phase included state-of-the-art technology rooms and three new science laboratories.

Furthermore, in April 2010, the first section of phase two opened which included a Science 'Heart Space' with six laboratories leading off from it. The space is used as a flexible teaching area and has new Apple Inc. iMacs, interactive whiteboards and a plasma TV.
In May 2010, the Adult Education facilities relocated from the existing building to its brand new area in the new school.

Due to delays, it is predicted that the second part of phase two of the remodelling was scheduled to open in September 2010, ready for the then-new school year. This will see the opening of Lea Manor's newly constructed entrance, dining facilities, community theatre, music studios and drama rooms.

Notable Alumni
 Andrew Tate
 Tristan Tate

Gallery

References

School Website
School website

Secondary schools in Luton
Foundation schools in Luton
Educational institutions established in 1974
1974 establishments in England
Specialist arts colleges in England